The Virginia Slims of Houston is a defunct WTA Tour affiliated tennis tournament played from 1970 to 1995. It was held in Houston, Texas in the United States and played on indoor carpet courts from 1970 to 1984 and on outdoor clay courts from 1985 to 1995.

The event has the distinction of being the first-ever tournament on the professional women's circuit, which would eventually become the WTA Tour. In 1971, the event served as the series Championships of the inaugural Virginia Slims Tour.

Martina Navratilova was the most successful player at the tournament, winning the singles and doubles competitions six times each, partnering Dutchwomen Betty Stöve and Manon Bollegraf and Americans Janet Newberry, Pam Shriver, Elise Burgin and Kathy Jordan once each for her doubles successes.

Finals

Singles

Doubles

References
 WTA Results Archive

External links

 
Hard court tennis tournaments
Carpet court tennis tournaments
Indoor tennis tournaments
Defunct tennis tournaments in the United States
Recurring sporting events established in 1970
Recurring events disestablished in 1995
Virginia Slims tennis tournaments
1970 establishments in Texas
1995 disestablishments in Texas
Tennis tournaments in Texas